Noah Emmanuel Jean Holm (born 23 June 2001) is a professional footballer who plays as a forward for Reims, on loan from Rosenborg. Born in Denmark, he has represented Norway internationally at various youth levels.

Personal life
Holm is the son of the Danish former footballer, David Nielsen. He is of Danish and Congolese descent through his father. Eligible for his father's nation Denmark, Holm nonetheless chose to be a Norway youth international.

Career statistics

Club

References

2001 births
Living people
Norwegian people of Danish descent
Norwegian people of Democratic Republic of the Congo descent
Sportspeople from Drammen
Norwegian footballers
Association football forwards
Norway youth international footballers
Primeira Liga players
Løv-Ham Fotball players
FK Fyllingsdalen players
Strømsgodset Toppfotball players
RB Leipzig players
Vitória S.C. players
Stade de Reims players
Norwegian expatriate footballers
Norwegian expatriate sportspeople in Germany
Expatriate footballers in Germany
Norwegian expatriate sportspeople in Portugal
Expatriate footballers in Portugal
Norwegian expatriate sportspeople in France
Expatriate footballers in France